David McKay (born 1 March 1960 in Winnipeg) is a Canadian former wrestler who competed in the 1984 Summer Olympics and in the 1988 Summer Olympics.

References

External links
 

1960 births
Living people
Sportspeople from Winnipeg
Olympic wrestlers of Canada
Wrestlers at the 1984 Summer Olympics
Wrestlers at the 1988 Summer Olympics
Canadian male sport wrestlers
Commonwealth Games gold medallists for Canada
Wrestlers at the 1986 Commonwealth Games
Commonwealth Games medallists in wrestling
20th-century Canadian people
Medallists at the 1986 Commonwealth Games